Ronald Daugherty (born March 17, 1958) is a former American football wide receiver who played for the Minnesota Vikings of the National Football League (NFL). He played college football at the Northeastern Illinois University.

References 

1958 births
American football wide receivers
Minnesota Vikings players
Living people
National Football League replacement players